Andreas Seidl (born 6 January 1976) is a German motorsport engineer and manager. He is currently the Chief Executive Officer of Sauber Motorsport, and previously team principal of the McLaren Formula One team and the hybrid Porsche LMP1 program.

Career
Seidl graduated from the Technical University of Munich with a diploma in mechanical engineering. Seidl worked in F1 for BMW between 2000 and 2009. After BMW withdrew from Formula 1, Seidl then managed BMW's DTM comeback in 2012. In 2013, Seidl joined the Porsche LMP1 squad as director of race operations and was promoted to team principal in 2014. On 10 January 2019, McLaren appointed Seidl as team principal of their Formula 1 team. He started working with the team on 1 May 2019. On 13 December 2022, it was announced Seidl would become CEO of Sauber Motorsport in January 2023, and would leave McLaren with immediate effect.

References

1976 births
Living people
McLaren people
Formula One team principals
BMW people
Porsche people
German motorsport people
German automotive engineers
People from Passau
Sportspeople from Lower Bavaria
Engineers from Bavaria